Gilles Kahn (April 17, 1946 – February 9, 2006) was a French computer scientist. He notably introduced Kahn process networks as a model for parallel processing and natural semantics for describing the operational semantics of programming languages.

Gilles Kahn was born in Paris. He studied at the École polytechnique (X1964) and at Stanford. He became a member of the French Academy of Sciences in 1997. He was president and director-general of INRIA from 2004 to 2006. He died in Garches.

External links
 Page at the French academy of sciences
 Page at INRIA

1946 births
2006 deaths
French computer scientists
Members of the French Academy of Sciences
École Polytechnique alumni